Voio is a municipality in the Kozani regional unit, Greece. The seat of the municipality is the town Siatista. It was named after the Voio mountains. The municipality has an area of 1007.629 km2. Its population at the 2011 census was 18,386.

Municipality
The municipality Voio was formed at the 2011 local government reform by the merger of the following 5 former municipalities, that became municipal units:
Askio
Neapoli
Pentalofos
Siatista
Tsotyli

Province
The province of Voio was one of the provinces of the Kozani Prefecture. Its territory corresponded with that of the current municipality Voio. It was abolished in 2006.

References

Municipalities of Western Macedonia
Provinces of Greece
Populated places in Kozani (regional unit)